The Chenab Valley is a river valley formed by the Chenab River. The term is also used collectively for Doda, Kishtwar and Ramban districts of Jammu Division in Jammu and Kashmir, India. These districts were formerly part of a single district, called Doda.

Name
The name derives from the Chenab river, which flows through and forms the valley. The term "Chenab valley" was used by Erik Norin in a 1926 journal article "The Relief Chronology of Chenab Valley", to refer to the valley formed by the Chenab river in the Himalayas. More recently, this term has also come to be used by various social activists and politicians referring to the areas of the former Doda district formed in 1948.
The term is used by many residents of Doda, Ramban, Kishtwar districts to assert a distinct cultural identity within the larger Jammu division.

Geography
The Chenab Valley lies between the middle and great Himalayan range in the Jammu region of Jammu and Kashmir, India. It constitutes parts of the Doda, Ramban, and Kishtwar districts of Jammu and Kashmir. The area is an active seismic zone.

History
In the past, the area around Doda was largely inhabited by Sarazi population before people started settling here from the Kashmir valley and other adjoining areas. The reasons for this migration in the 17th and 18th centuries are a matter of ambiguity among historians. Sumantra Bose says that repression by the feudal class in the Kashmir valley drew people to these areas. The three districts consist of areas drawn from the principalities of Kishtwar and Bhadarwah, both of which were part of  Udhampur district in the princely state of Jammu and Kashmir. In addition, Paddar used to part of Chamba State in the past and was later added to the princely state. Kashmiris form the largest group in the three districts while Gujjars, Dogras, Paharis and Bhaderwahis have significant population. Chenab Valley is rich in cultural heritage and ethical values, but also has age-old traditions of secularism and tolerance.

Demographics

Religion

Muslims form a majority in the three districts constituting Chenab Valley. About 60% of the population was Muslim according to the 2011 census, and the rest 40% are mostly Hindus.

Languages

Chenab Valley is home to a variety of ethnic groups. Officially, Urdu and English are used, but the Chenab Valley is home to a variety of languages, including Kashmiri—spoken by almost half of the population, Gojri, Kishtwari, Bhaderwahi, Sarazi, Dogri, Rambani, Pogali, Pahari, Bhalessi, and Padri.

Administration
, the DIG of Police has a separate post for Chenab Valley known as the DKR Range; the R&B Department has now created a distinct zone for Chenab; and Chenab Valley has its own Forest Circle known as Chenab Forest Circle. A militia named as Village Defence Guards was established in 1996 to fight anti-militancy operations in Chenab Valley.

Major tourist attractions

Bhaderwah
Jai valley
Padri Pass
Sinthan Top
Lal Draman
Jantroon Dhar

Demands for Divisional Status

There has been a movement demanding separate administrative division for the Chenab valley by various social and political activists for long time. In 2014, a major protest was called in Doda for the demand of separate administrative division. The demand again rose in 2018 and 2019 when Ladakh got divisional status and the former Chief Minister of Jammu and Kashmir, Omar Abdullah added "Two Separate Divisional Status for Chenab Valley and Pir Panjal Region" to his party's political agenda. As of 2021, the movement for divisional status again increased after rumours of second bifurcation of J&K and demand for a separate state of Jammu. There is a common reason for this demand. People allege negligence in terms of developmental issues by the government if the Chenab valley remains linked to the Jammu division. The districts of the proposed Chenab Valley consists of six Assembly seats.

The Bhartiya Janata Party  maintains that "there is no Chenab valley and it is only the Jammu division for representation of the region", while the JKNC says that the demand is based on developmental negligence and wants separate divisions from Jammu division for Chenab valley and Pir Panjal.

The areas of the three districts are termed as the DKR Range (Doda-Kishtwar-Ramban Range) by police and military officials, while a separate Deputy Inspector General is posted for this range by J&K Police.

Hill Development Council
In 1996, Dr. Farooq Abdullah as Chief minister promised administrative autonomy to Chenab. Later in 2000, a bill demanding a Hill Development Council for Chenab valley was presented in the legislative assembly by the Sheikh Abdul Rehman (then MLA from Bhaderwah).

Natural disasters

2013 Earthquake in Chenab valley
A 5.8 earthquake hit the Erstwhile Doda on 1 May 2013, killing two and injuring 69. Seismic activity continued in the valley throughout 2013, prompting teams of seismologists to study the area. A local belief states that the earthquakes were being caused by hydroelectric construction projects in the area.

2017 Thathri flash floods
Flash floods wreaked havoc in Thathri town of Doda district of J&K, inundating vast areas along the Batote- Kishtwar National Highway and washing away half a dozen houses. Six persons were killed in the flash floods.

2021 Hunzar Kishtwar Cloudburst

Cloudburst hits Hunzar hamlet in Dachhan area of Kishtwar district resulting into death of 26 persons and 17 injured on 28 July 2021. As per reports, only 7 dead bodies were recovered while 19 dead bodies were not found. As of October 5, 2021, one out of 19 missing persons' dead bodies was found after more than 70 days, while 18 others remain missing.

See also
Jai valley
Chinta valley
The Chenab Times
Warwan Valley

References

Notes

Valleys of Jammu and Kashmir
Jammu Division
Himalayas
Chenab Valley